Nobe may refer to:

People
 Toshio Nobe (born 1957), Japanese manga artist
 Yuta Nobe (born 1998), Japanese football player

Places
 Nobe, West Virginia, United States

Other
 National Organization for Business and Engineering
 Nobe GT100, a concept car